Halyna Ivanivna Vasylchenko (born 24 October 1983) is a Ukrainian politician currently serving as a People's Deputy of Ukraine from Ukraine's 118th electoral district since 29 August 2019. She is a member of Holos.

Early life and career 
In 2001, she studied the English language at Premier London College, and in 2005 she graduated from the University of Lviv's International Relations faculty, majoring in international economic relations. In 2008, she graduated from the University of Lviv's law faculty. From 2014 to 2019, Vasylchenko studied at the Ukrainian Catholic University, completing a variety of programmes.

From 2002 to 2007, Vasylchenko worked in the private sector as a specialist in international economic relations. Afterwards, she worked in the investment department of the Lviv city council until 2017.

Political career 
Vasylchenko first campaigned for political office in 2015 to the Lviv city council as a member of the Ukrainian Galician Party.But she didn’t win the election. From 2017, she was head of the Ukrainian Galician Party's group of economic experts, and helped to develop the party's economic policy. 2018 to 2019, she was head of the Ukrainian Galician Party in Lviv.

People's Deputy of Ukraine 
Vasylchenko ran in the 2019 Ukrainian parliamentary election as the candidate of Holos for People's Deputy of Ukraine from Ukraine's 118th electoral district. She was successful, defeating incumbent People's Deputy  with 31.61% of the vote to Dubnevych's 29.81%. In the Verkhovna Rada (Ukraine's parliament), Vasylchenko joined the Verkhovna Rada Committee on Finance, Tax, and Custom Policy.

In June 2021, Vasylchenko, along with 10 other deputies of Holos, joined Justice, a group of dissident members of Holos.

References 

1983 births
Living people
Ninth convocation members of the Verkhovna Rada
Members of the Ukrainian Greek Catholic Church
People from Lviv Oblast
Ukrainian Catholic University alumni
University of Lviv alumni
Voice (Ukrainian political party) politicians
Women members of the Verkhovna Rada